Kim Sang-do (born 29 May 1987) is a South Korean sports shooter. He competed in the men's 10 metre air pistol event at the 2020 Summer Olympics.

References

1987 births
Living people
South Korean male sport shooters
Olympic shooters of South Korea
Shooters at the 2020 Summer Olympics
Place of birth missing (living people)
Asian Games medalists in shooting
Shooters at the 2014 Asian Games
Medalists at the 2014 Asian Games
Asian Games silver medalists for South Korea
20th-century South Korean people
21st-century South Korean people